Kalyan Shrestha (born 14 April 1951) is the former Chief Justice of the Supreme Court of Nepal.

References

External links 
 Official website of Supreme Court of Nepal

People from Baglung District
1951 births
Living people
20th-century Nepalese judges
Justices of the Supreme Court of Nepal
21st-century Nepalese judges
Chief justices of Nepal